Carposina engalactis is a moth in the family Carposinidae. It was described by Edward Meyrick in 1932. It is found in Brazil.

References

Carposinidae
Moths described in 1932
Moths of South America